Gilles Verdez (born 8 August 1964 in Saint-Germain-en-Laye) is a French journalist, television and radio columnist. He is the co-author of books about football in France as well as politics.

Biography 
After graduating from the Centre de formation des journalistes de Paris in 1988, he started his journalism career at Le Parisien newspaper.  On 5 May 1992, Gilles was present at the Armand Cesari Stadium in the city of Furiani, Corsica and was one of the wounded. In September 2009, when he was editor at Le Parisien, he was dismissed by General Director Jean Hornain along with the chief editor Dominique de Montvalon and the editor Phulippe Duley. This happened due to decreasing sales of 4%. 
In November 2009 he became deputy director of the sales of France-Soir and director of the sports department from August 2011 to January 2012. 
Chronicler of the show, we remade the game, on RTL, to I-TV and RFI, and author of five books on football, he was a reporter for L'Équipe.

He joined the show Touche pas à mon poste! as a columnist during 2013–2014 seasons, 2014-2015 and 2015–2016, and teamed with Cyril Hanouna in broadcasting Feet in the flat on the radio station Europe 1. He appears regularly on CNews.

Awards 
 Prix de littérature politique Edgar-Faure en 2013 pour Le Conquistador : Manuel Valls, les secrets d'un destin
Proposal

In February 2017, Gilles Verdez publicly proposed to his girlfriend, Fatou, during Touche Pas à Mon Poste (TPMP) TV show. After expressing multiple reasons that made him loving her, he asked her to marry him. Her reaction, or rather the lack of it, created a media storm.

Television 
 Since 2013: Touche pas à mon poste ! (D8) : columnist

Publications 
 Les années Jacquet, with Vanessa Caffin, éditions Solar, 1999.
 Les années Lemerre, with Vanessa Caffin, éditions Solar, 2001.
 Le roman noir des bleus, avec Eugène Saccomano, éditions de La Martinière, 2010.
 
 
 
 
 Allez le PSG !, avec Eugène Saccomano et Gervais, Pat a Pan éditions, 2013.
 
 Gilles Verdez et Jacques Hennen, Le système Benzema, éditions Mazarine, 2 mars 2016

References 

1964 births
Living people
French television journalists
French sports journalists
21st-century French non-fiction writers
French male non-fiction writers
People from Saint-Germain-en-Laye